Ilex abscondita is a species of plant in the family Aquifoliaceae. It is endemic to Venezuela.

References

abscondita
Endemic flora of Venezuela
Vulnerable flora of South America
Taxonomy articles created by Polbot